The Bengal bush lark (Mirafra assamica) or Bengal lark is a species of lark in the family Alaudidae found in southern Asia.

Taxonomy and systematics 

The differences within the genus Mirafra are often very subtle and confusing with many differences apparent only when specimens are examined in hand.

The Bengal bush lark was earlier classified into several races, the Bengal race assamica and the Madras race affinis. These were subsequently split, on the basis of diagnostic song and display characters, into the Jerdon's bush lark (Mirafra affinis) and assamica in the strict sense. Formerly, both the Burmese bush lark and Jerdon's bush lark were considered subspecies of the Bengal bush lark (as M. a. microptera and M. a. affinis respectively) until split to form a separate species. The alternate name "rufous-winged bush lark" may also be used to describe the red-winged lark. Another alternate name for the Bengal bush lark is the rufous-winged lark.

Description 
The Bengal bush lark is short-tailed and has a strong stout bill. It is not as long as the skylark, measuring about 15 centimetres in length. It is dark-streaked grey above, and buff below, with spotting on the breast and behind the eye. The wings are rufous.

The song of the Bengal bush lark is a repetition of thin disyllabic notes, delivered in a song-flight.

Distribution and habitat 

The Bengal bush lark is a resident breeder in the Indian subcontinent and south-east Asia, and found in the countries of Bangladesh, Bhutan, India, Myanmar and Nepal, with an estimated global extent of occurrence of 100,000-1,000,000 square kilometres.

The Bengal bush lark is a common bird of dry, open, stony country often with sparse shrubs, and cultivated areas.

Behaviour and ecology
It nests on the ground, laying three or four speckled eggs. This lark feeds primarily on seeds and insects, especially the latter during the breeding season.

Gallery

References

External links 

Species factsheet - BirdLife International

Mirafra
Birds of Bhutan
Birds of India
Birds of Nepal
Birds of Bangladesh
Birds described in 1840